German character and virtual band Gummibär has released seven studio albums, one soundtrack album, seven extended plays (EPs), and 37 singles. The character was created by animator Peter Dodd in 2006.

In November 2007, Gummibär released its debut album I Am Your Gummy Bear featuring the hit single "I'm a Gummy Bear (The Gummy Bear Song)". The album peaked at number 30 on the Portuguese Albums Chart. The second Gummibär album, La La Love to Dance, was released in March 2010 on the Gummybear International label, peaking at number 16. The project would later result in the spin-off movie Gummibär: The Yummy Gummy Search for Santa and the show Gummibär and Friends: The Gummy Bear Show, which were met with mostly negative reviews.

Since then, four more albums were released from 2015 to 2021 without chart success. The Gummy Bear Show resulted in a soundtrack album for the first season, released in August 2018.

Albums

Studio albums

Soundtrack albums

Extended plays

Singles

Other songs

Notes

References

External links
 
 

Discography
Discographies of German artists